{{DISPLAYTITLE:C11H12O4}}
The molecular formula C11H12O4 (molar mass: 208.21 g/mol, exact mass: 208.073559 u) may refer to:

 3,4-Dimethoxycinnamic acid
 Ethyl caffeate, a hydroxycinnamic acid ethyl ester
 Macrophomic acid
 Sinapaldehyde
 6-Methoxymellein